The following elections occurred in the year 1890.

 1890 Japanese general election
 1890 Peruvian presidential election

North America

Canada
 1890 British Columbia general election
 1890 New Brunswick general election
 1890 Nova Scotia general election
 1890 Ontario general election
 1890 Prince Edward Island general election
 1890 Quebec general election

United States
 United States House of Representatives elections in California, 1890
 1890 New York state election
 United States House of Representatives elections in South Carolina, 1890
 1890 South Carolina gubernatorial election
 1890 United States House of Representatives elections
 1890 United States Senate elections

Europe
 1890 Danish Folketing election
 1890 German federal election
 1890 Portuguese legislative election

United Kingdom
 1890 Caernarvon Boroughs by-election
 1890 Eccles by-election

Oceania

Australia
 1890 South Australian colonial election

New Zealand
 1890 New Zealand general election
 1890 Timaru by-election

See also
 :Category:1890 elections

1890
Elections